USS Eolus may refer to:

, was a side wheel steamer commissioned 12 August 1864 and sold 1 August 1865
, was the former USS Shawnee, only holding the name for two months in 1869

United States Navy ship names